Keith Cameron (born 31 January 1947) is a Guyanese cricketer. He played in twenty-three first-class and four List A matches for Guyana from 1972 to 1978.

See also
 List of Guyanese representative cricketers

References

External links
 

1947 births
Living people
Guyanese cricketers
Guyana cricketers
Sportspeople from Georgetown, Guyana